Cheyenne High School is a high school in North Las Vegas, Nevada, United States.

The school was built in 1991, with an adjacent four portable classrooms, in North Las Vegas, a rapidly growing suburban middle class community. As of the 2006–2007 school year, the school's ethnic ratio was 29.7% White, 33.3% African American, 29.8% Hispanic, 6.4% Asian/Pacific Islander and 0.7% Native American. The male/female population was 53.2%/46.8%, and 14% of the students were IEP (students with disabilities).  At that time, Cheyenne had a 59.2% graduation rate.

Notable programs
Cheyenne High School implemented a number of programs in the 2007–2008 school year that can be accredited to then principal Dr. Jeffrey J. Geihs.  These programs include:

Standard Student Attire (SSA), also known as school uniforms, is intended to decrease disciplinary issues, create a safer campus and promote more efficient student learning.
Pull-out tutoring – Non-proficient juniors and seniors who are in jeopardy of not passing their proficiency exam receive tutoring for the proficiency test during the school day, instead of staying late, coming early, or getting help elsewhere.
Educational Exchange Program - The school is one of only ten in the US to have this program, which is soon to include Algeria and Russia.
Smaller Learning Communities - This program began in the 2009–2010 school year. It includes four houses, each with its own motto. This is meant to provide a better chance to match students up with the right assistant principals, counselors, and teachers.
United States Army JROTCs first year was 2009–2010, and it was conducted by Sgt. Major Schoolfield.
Desert Shields Marching Band began in the 1991–1992 school year, under the direction of Mr. Valenzuela.  It was then conducted by, Daniel Haddad until 2014. To which then it was conducted by Joseph Brueckmann from 2014–2016. The current Director of Bands, as of 2016, is Siobhan Fergiels.

Athletics

Fall sports
Cross country  (Coach Scott Thrasher)
Football  (Head Coach David Cochran)
Women's volleyball (John Armstrong)
Tennis (Coach Burnham)
Women's golf

Winter sports
Basketball (men's basketball Teral Fair; women's basketball Kristal Cummings)
Wrestling (Coach Abrams)
Bowling (Coach Hernandez, SGT. Major Schoolfield, and Coach Jim) - 2008-2009 Academic State Champs, boys and girls
Women's soccer (Coach Bahena)
Winterline (Mr. Haddad)

Spring sports
Track (Coach Thrahser)
Baseball
Softball (Coach Hernandez, Coach Spurk)
Boys' volleyball (Coach Joey and others)
Swimming (Coach Garcia)
Men's golf (Coach Burnham)

Nevada Interscholastic Activities Association 
 Cross country (girls') - 1996, 1997

References

External links
 

High schools in Clark County, Nevada
Educational institutions established in 1991
Buildings and structures in North Las Vegas, Nevada
School buildings completed in 1991
Public high schools in Nevada
1991 establishments in Nevada

Clark County School District